Prestige Group is a property development company in South India. It was founded by Razack Sattar in 1986 and is based in Bangalore. Prestige has developed several residential colonies and commercial spaces in Bangalore, Chennai, Kochi, Calicut, Hyderabad, Mangalore, and Mysore, including Prestige Shantiniketan, UB City, Prestige Golfshire, Prestige Acropolis, The Forum, The Forum Value, The Forum Vijaya, and The Celebration Mall.

History
Prestige Group was founded by Razack Sattar. During the 1960s and late 1970s his sons Irfan Razack and Rezwan Razack worked with him, and his youngest son Noaman Razzack also joined when the business grew. Began its journey from retail business but moved to real estate with its first project Prestige Court at KH road, Bangalore. The company is ISO 9001:2008 certified. To date, Prestige Group has completed 192 Projects spanning to an extent of 64 million sft.

References

Companies based in Bangalore
Indian companies established in 1986
Real estate companies of India
Companies based in Hyderabad, India
1986 establishments in Karnataka
Companies listed on the National Stock Exchange of India
Companies listed on the Bombay Stock Exchange

Prestige Primrose Hills is a new premium upcoming apartment for sale located in prime location of Kankapura, East Bangalore. Project is spread over huge land with possession on 2025 onwards. Prestige Primrose Hills Kankapurais well connected to Schools, Colleges, Hospitals & Shopping Malls.